The Solidarity Bridge is a cable-stayed bridge over the Vistula River in Płock, Poland, being in a sequence of two national roads: national road no. 60 and national road no. 62.

The main span of the Solidarity Bridge is 375 metres long. The main span is one of the longest in the world among cable stayed bridges with cables located in single plane. At the same time, it is the longest span in the world among cable stayed bridges with a fixed-in deck pylon.

The main span of the Solidarity Bridge is the longest span in Poland and this part of Europe.

The Solidarity Bridge in Płock is largest and longest cable-stayed bridge in Poland at 615 metres long.

History
The Bridge was built from July 2002 till October 2007 and opened on 13 October 2007.

See also
 Solidarity Bridge in Płock on the list of largest cable-stayed bridges

References

External links
 

Bridges in Płock
Bridges completed in 2007
Cable-stayed bridges in Poland
Road bridges in Poland
2007 establishments in Poland